Cehl Meeah (born Cehl Fakeemeeah, 1958) is a Mauritian politician who is the leader of the Mauritian Solidarity Front and is supported by thousands of partisans both in Mauritius and around the world. He ran for the elections in 1991and had a sizable percentage of votes, but could not be elected. However, in 1995, Mauritian Solidarity Front, at that time known as Hizbullah, won one seat in the Parliament through Imaam Mustafa Beehary ; elected Best Loser in Circonstuency no 3. However at the legislative elections of 11 September 2000, the party lost the seat. In 2001 ; Cehl Meeah was elected in Ward 4 of Port Louis during Municipal elections but lost it in Municipal elections 2005. He was elected back in 2010 General Elections but lost it in 2014 General Elections.

DETAILED RESULTS OF CEHL MEEAH

 General Elections 1991 - Circonstuency No 3 -  2611 votes - Party Hizbullah 
 Partial Elections 1992 - Circonstuency No 3 - 4209 votes - Party Hizbullah
 General Elections 1995 - Circonstuency No 3 -  4071 votes - Party Hizbullah
 General Elections 2000 - Circonstuency No 3 - 4714 votes - Party Hizbullah 
Municipal Elections 2001 - Ward 4 of Port Louis - 3781 votes (Elected) - Party Hizbullah
 General Elections 2005 - Circonstuency No 3 - 5237 votes - Party FSM 
Municipal Elections 2005 - Ward 4 of Port Louis - 2251 votes - Party FSM
 Partial Elections 2009 - Circonstuency No 8 - 292 votes - Party FSM 
 General Elections 2010 - Circonstuency No 3 - 6204 Votes (ELECTED) -Party FSM
 General Elections 2014 - Circonstuency No 3 - 4362 Votes - Party FSM 
Municipal Elections 2015 - Ward 5 of Port Louis - 1777 votes - Party FSM
 Partial Elections 2017 - Circonstuency No 18 - 48 Votes - Party FSM 
 General Elections 2019 - Circonstuency No 3 - 1178 Votes - Party FSM

Early life and education
Cehl Meeah was born on 14 March 1958 in Port Louis in a middle-class Islamic conservative family. His grandfather was a congregational leader for more than 40 years. Being fluent in the Quran in his early ages, he started teaching the Quran in the local masjid at the age of 13. By the age of 16/17, he was already leading preaching in different study circles as well as leading congregation prayers in one mosque in Port Louis. He attended Royal College Port Louis from 1969 to 1974 and continued his studies at John Kennedy College till 1976. During his secondary studies at John Kennedy College, Cehl struggled for obtaining a special place for accomplishing the daily Islamic prayers and special Friday prayers. After his studies at John Kennedy College, he headed to continue his Islamic studies in Lucknow where he also met some prominent Islamic scholars like Abul A'la Maududi. During this period, he obtained a scholarship for studying Islamic Jurisprudence & Usul-al-fiqh at Umm al-Qura University of Makka, Saudi Arabia.

After returning completed his bachelor studies in Islamic jurisprudence from Saudi Arabia, he returned to Mauritius and founded Jamaat-Ul-Muslimeen and Dar-ul-Maarif primary & secondary school located at Curepipe. In 2012 , he inaugurated The Quranic Institute in Stanley , Rose Hill & in 2016 he inaugurated Markaz Tahfeez Ul Quraan in Curepipe , where students stay in the Markaz in order to learn and memorise the Quraan . He has many centres in different parts of Mauritius such as Plain Magnien , Chemin Grenier and LaCavern

References

Mauritian politicians
1958 births
Living people